The Strike That Changed New York is a history book about the New York City teachers' strike of 1968 written by Jerald Podair and published by the Yale University Press in 2004.

Further reading

External links 

 

1968 in New York City
1968 labor disputes and strikes
2004 non-fiction books
African-American history in New York City
African American–Jewish relations
American history books
American Federation of Teachers
Books about African-American history
History books about Jews and Judaism
Books about New York City
Books about labor history
Education labor disputes in the United States
English-language books
Labor disputes in New York City
Labor relations in New York City
Jews and Judaism in Brooklyn
Multiracial affairs in the United States
Racism in the United States
Yale University Press books
History books about education